Larry Flowers may refer to:

 Larry Flowers (American football) (born 1958), former professional American football player 
 Larry L. Flowers (born 1952), former Republican member of the Ohio House of Representatives